Tecmerium is a genus of moths in the family Blastobasidae.

Species
Tecmerium anthophaga
Tecmerium mnemosynella
Tecmerium perplexum
Tecmerium rosmarinella
Tecmerium spermophagia

References

Blastobasidae genera